Levina is a rural locality (a village) in Yorgvinskoye Rural Settlement, Kudymkarsky District, Perm Krai, Russia. The population was 107 as of 2010.

Geography 
It is located 10 km north from Kudymkar.

References 

Rural localities in Kudymkarsky District